Damien Bodie (born 2 January 1985) is an Australian television actor from Melbourne. Bodie began his career securing roles in children's television roles such as his three-year stint as Ram Foley in Crash Zone. He later secured the regular role of Dylan Timmins in the soap opera Neighbours. In 2011, he took the role of Jonathan Kurtiss in the drama series Winners & Losers and remained until 2014.

Career
Bodie was educated at Sandringham Secondary College. Bodie first appeared on television aged seven. He also appeared in the 2005 Australian film Hating Alison Ashley and as Josh in the 2002 Canadian-Australian television series Guinevere Jones. Bodie also appeared in The Saddle Club.

In 1999, he began appearing as Ram Foley in the children's series Crash Zone. In 2002, he played Oscar Coxon in the children's series Short Cuts, which aired on the Seven Network. He has also secured guest roles in Ocean Girl, Blue Heelers and City Homicide.

Damien Bodie had previously made two appearances in the soap opera Neighbours as Charlie Moyes in 1996 and Liam Rigby in 1999, before securing the regular role of Dylan Timmins in 2005.

In 2008, Bodie portrayed Vashan in the Australian children's television series The Elephant Princess. In July 2010, Bodie joined the cast of Seven Network's new drama series in the Australian drama series, Winners & Losers, playing Jonathan Kurtiss. Bodie had previously worked with Winners and Losers producer Maryanne Carroll on the show Short Cuts. Carroll remembered his performance and helped him secure the role.

On 24 November 2019, Neighbours confirmed that Bodie had reprised the role of Dylan for the show's 35th anniversary in March 2020.

Bodie is currently living in Los Angeles.

Filmography

References

External links

Australian male soap opera actors
Australian male child actors
1985 births
Living people